Gunikha is a rural locality (a selo) in Peshchersky Selsoviet, Zalesovsky District, Altai Krai, Russia. The population was 181 as of 2013. There are 8 streets.

Geography 
Gunikha is located 35 km north of Zalesovo (the district's administrative centre) by road. Peshcherka is the nearest rural locality.

References 

Rural localities in Zalesovsky District